Lime Rock may refer to a place in the United States:

 Lime Rock (Salisbury, Connecticut), a neighborhood in the village of Lakeville, Connecticut
 Lime Rock Park, an auto racetrack
 Lime Rock, Rhode Island, a village
 Lime Rock Light, a lighthouse in Newport, Rhode Island now known as the Ida Lewis Rock Light